Krystal Marie Peterson (née Harris; November 7, 1981) is an actress, singer-songwriter and pianist known for her 2001 contributions to The Princess Diaries soundtracks and for her album Me & My Piano. Her singing career was aided by the Backstreet Boys on tour, and she has toured with bassist Victor Wooten.

As an actress, she appeared in a television film titled Save the Last Dance, and in an episode of Touched by an Angel.

Career
She got her first big break performing the title song "Supergirl!" on Disney's The Princess Diaries soundtracks and was also known for touring as the opening act for the Backstreet Boys on The Black & Blue Tour.

Her debut album was called Me & My Piano, and it was released on June 5, 2001, right before the success of the film The Princess Diaries. She also provided her song "Love Is a Beautiful Thing" for the film Legally Blonde; the song was remixed for the soundtrack. In 2002, she released the song "The Kid in You" for Disney's The Country Bears soundtrack as well as appearing in the film as herself. She also guest-starred as the lead role in the Touched by an Angel episode 9x16: "A Song for My Father". Additionally, she provided the singing voice for Velma at the end of the direct to DVD movie Scooby-Doo! and the Legend of the Vampire.

She later went by Miss Krystal and recorded an album titled Hip-Hop Soul, Vol. 1. It was intended to be released in late 2002 but was shelved.

In 2002, Harris played an art student in the Paramount TV movie called Save the Last Dance, based on the film of the same name. Set at an art school, Harris described the concept as "the next Fame". The film was meant to serve as a series pilot, but it was not picked up.

She was the lead singer on Victor Wooten's 2012–2013 tour.

In July 2013 she started performing as Krystal Peterson & the Queen City Band. They released an EP on iTunes named Spell.

Personal life
Harris married Daniel Peterson and they settled in Cincinnati, Ohio. Peterson is the drummer for her band.

Discography

Albums
 Me & My Piano (2001)
 Miss Krystal Presents Hip-Hop Soul, Vol. 1 (Never released)
 Spell (2013) as Krystal Peterson & The Queen City Band

Soundtracks
 Princess Diaries soundtrack (2001)
 Legally Blonde soundtrack (2001)
 The Country Bears soundtrack (2002)

Singles
 "My Religion" (2000)
 "Supergirl!" (2001)
 "Love is a Beautiful Thing" (2001)
 "The Kid in You" (2002)

References

External links
 
 
 

1981 births
Living people
20th-century American women singers
21st-century American women singers
21st-century American women pianists
21st-century American pianists
American women pop singers
Musicians from Anderson, Indiana
Writers from Anderson, Indiana
20th-century American singers
21st-century American singers